Saeculum may refer to:
Saeculum, length of time
Saeculum (journal), scholarly journal